Football at the 2011 Pacific Games was held from 27 August to 9 September 2011 at several venues with tournaments for men's and women's teams. 

The men's tournament was intended to be part of the Qualification in Oceania for the 2014 FIFA World Cup, however the format was amended in June 2011 and the Pacific Games are no longer a part of the qualification process.

Events

Medal table

Medal summary

References
Football at the 2011 Pacific Games

 
2011
2011 Pacific Games
Pac
2011
2011 in New Caledonian sport